The 1984 season was the 15th season of national competitive association football in Australia and 101st overall.

National teams

Australia national soccer team

Results and fixtures

Friendlies

Australia national under-23 soccer team

Men's football

National Soccer League

Cup competitions

NSL Cup

Final

References

External links
 Football Australia official website

1984 in Australian soccer
Seasons in Australian soccer